Now: The Hits of Winter 2008 is the 21st album of the Australian Now! series. The album was certified platinum and was the 9th compilation of the year.

Track listing
 Madonna featuring Justin Timberlake and Timbaland – "4 Minutes" (4:05)
 Gabriella Cilmi – "Sweet About Me" (3:23)
 Flo Rida featuring T-Pain – "Low" (3:50)
 The Veronicas – "This Love" (2:59)
 Finger Eleven – "Paralyzer" (3:25)
 Kelis – "I Don't Think So" (3:03)
 Axle Whitehead – "I Don't Do Surprises" (3:09)
 The Last Goodnight – "Stay Beautiful" (3:11)
 Panic! at the Disco – "Nine in the Afternoon" (3:12)
 Coldplay – "Violet Hill" (3:14)
 Linkin Park – "Shadow of the Day" (4:15)
 Kylie Minogue – "In My Arms" (3:31)
 Matchbox Twenty – "All Your Reasons" (2:38)
 Simple Plan – "Your Love Is a Lie" (3:40)
 Miley Cyrus – "Start All Over" (3:25)
 Jonas Brothers – "S.O.S." (2:32)
 The Galvatrons – "When We Were Kids" (3:49)
 The Kooks – "Always Where I Need to Be" (2:39)
 Gyroscope – "Australia" (3:48)
 Operator Please – "Two for My Seconds" (4:01)
 Alphabeat – "Fascination" (3:02)
 Utah Saints – "Something Good '08" (2:45)
 Fragma – "Toca's Miracle 2008" (3:28)

References

External links
Now - The Hits Of Winter 2008

2008 compilation albums
EMI Records compilation albums
Now That's What I Call Music! albums (Australian series)